Cedie, also known as Cedie: Ang Munting Prinsipe, is a 1996 Filipino family film loosely based on the popular anime Little Lord Fauntleroy which was in turn based on the 1886 children's novel of the same name by English playwright and author Frances Hodgson Burnett. The film was directed by Romy V. Suzara who also directed the film adaptation of Princess Sarah. The film starred Tom Taus Jr. as Cedric Erol.

In 2017, the film was digitally remastered by ABS-CBN's Film Restoration project.

Plot 
The story concerns an American boy named Cedie Erol, who at an early age finds that he is the sole heir to a British earldom and leaves New York City to take up residence in his ancestral castle, where, after some initial resistance, he is joined by his middle-class mother, the widow of the late heir. His grandfather, the Earl of Dorincourt, intends to teach the boy to become an aristocrat, but Cedie inadvertently teaches his grandfather compassion and social justice and the artless simplicity and motherly love of Dearest warms his heart.

Cast and characters 

 Tom Taus Jr. as Cedie Errol
 Ronaldo Valdez as the Earl of Dorincourt
 Jaclyn Jose as Annie Errol
 Mark Gil as Captain James Errol
 Noel Trinidad as Mr. Jefferson
 Subas Herrero as Mr. Hobbs
 Anita Linda as Mrs. Mellon
 Thou Reyes as Eric
 Carlo Aquino as Ray
 Tita de Villa as Mrs. Taylor
 Shiela Ysrael as Mina
 Bon Vibar as Mr. Habisham
 Chuckie Dreyfuss as Dick
 Korinne Lirio as Lady Brigette
 Melisse Santiago as Coleen
 Susan Lozada as Jane
 Menggie Cobarubbias as Newick
 Sara Polverini as Catherine
 Thelma Crisologo as Lady Claudette

Supporting roles

 Joseph McCarthy as Peter
 Mila Ferrer as Elizabeth
 Kenneth Cole as Mr Higgins
 Penny Miller as Mrs. Higgins
 Jose Javier de Silva as Wilkins
 Clint Fadera as Mickey
 Cris Soulios as Hartel
 Eugene Christensen as Ben
 Louie de Moral as Tom
 Michael Cruz as the bully boy
 Arsenio Ventosa as Alex
 Ria Salvador as Kim
 Eduardo Aquino as Dr. Gaston
 Francisco da Silva as the Priest in Brooklyn

Production
The live action movie was produced due to the success of the anime Little Lord Fauntleroy, known as Cedie, Ang Munting Prinsipe in the Philippines. Most of the film was shot on location in Spain, with other scenes shot on set in Baguio and Manila, Philippines.

Accolades
 Nominated Best Child Actor for Tom Taus at the 1997 FAMAS Awards.

References

External links

Philippine children's films
Films about Filipino families
1990s Tagalog-language films
Star Cinema films
Films set in New York City
Films set in England
Films shot in Spain
Films based on children's books
Films based on works by Frances Hodgson Burnett
1996 films
Films directed by Romy Suzara